The Old Town Historic District was the second historic district in Huntsville, Alabama. It was added to the National Register of Historic Places on July 18, 1978. Roughly bounded by Dement and Lincoln Sts., and Randolph and Walker Avenues, it features homes in a variety of styles including Victorian, Federal, Greek Revival, Queen Anne, American Craftsman, and even Prairie School with homes dating from the late 1820s through the early 20th century.

The Old Town Historic District had its beginnings in 1973, when local architect Harvie Jones suggested to home owners Charles E. and Frances J. Rice that they create another district to include the 19th century homes that remained outside of the Twickenham Historic District. The Rices accordingly began obtaining the necessary petitions and documents to gain first local, then state and finally national recognition for the Old Town Historic District. They were supported in their efforts by then Huntsville mayor Joe W. Davis, Madison County Commissioner Tilman Hill, and Alabama U. S. Senator John Sparkman. The Rices were later honored by the Alabama Historical Commission for their contributions to historic preservation, and in 2009 a small park in Old Town was named after them.

See also
National Register of Historic Places listings in Madison County, Alabama

References

External links 

Rice Park dedication
American Memory's Built in America Collection which has drawings, photographs, and descriptions of old homes and buildings.
Huntsville Pilgrimage Association Has annual tour of historic homes.

Historic districts in Huntsville, Alabama
National Register of Historic Places in Huntsville, Alabama
Greek Revival architecture in Alabama
American Craftsman architecture in Alabama
Federal architecture in Alabama